Bruno Fitoussi (born September 21, 1958) is a French professional poker player from Paris.
He totals 2 700 000 million dollars winnings in live poker tournaments.

Fitoussi's first televised poker outing was on the original poker show Late Night Poker. He finished 7th in his heat, which also featured Surinder Sunar, Peter "The Bandit" Evans and Donnacha O'Dea.

In 2001, Fitoussi won the World Heads-Up Poker Championship, defeating Amarillo Slim in the Grand Final.

In 2003, Fitoussi finished in 8th place in the first World Poker Tour (WPT) Championship. He also finished 15th in the $10,000 World Series of Poker (WSOP) Main Event.

In 2005, Fitoussi finished 2nd in the $1,500 Seven Card Razz event.

In 2007, Fitoussi finished 2nd to Freddy Deeb in the $50,000 WSOP H.O.R.S.E event, winning $1,278,720.

As of 2009, his total live tournament winnings exceed $2,300,000. His 8 cashes at the WSOP account for $1,516,167 of those winnings.

Fitoussi also works as an architect and plays the stock market. He has also worked as a music publisher and producer, and is currently the President of VIP-Gaming.

His wife Isabelle is a fashion designer for Kenzo. The couple have two children: Jason-Bowie and Fleur-Ilana.

References

External links

 Cardplayer.com profile

1958 births
Living people
French poker players
Poker commentators